Jean-Marie Grezet (born 16 January 1959) is a Swiss former professional racing cyclist. He rode in three editions of the Tour de France and one edition of the Giro d'Italia.

References

External links
 

1959 births
Living people
Swiss male cyclists
People from Le Locle
Sportspeople from the canton of Neuchâtel